Martin Dinha is the Provincial Governor and resident minister of Mashonaland Central, Zimbabwe . He is a member of the ZANU-PF party and an ex officio member of the Senate of Zimbabwe. He is a former Mayor of Bindura.

References

Provincial governors of Zimbabwe
Members of the Senate of Zimbabwe
Living people
Mayors of places in Zimbabwe
ZANU–PF politicians
People from Mashonaland Central Province
Year of birth missing (living people)